Gaetano Capogrosso (born 11 June 1989) is an Italian footballer who plays for ASD Siziano Lanterna.

Biography
Born in Villaricca, the Province of Naples, Campania, Capogrosso started his career at Tuscan club Siena. From 2009 to 2010 season to 2012–13 season he spent his professional career in Serie B and Lega Pro Prima Divisione (Italian second and third division respectively) in temporary deals. Capogrosso signed a 5-year contract with Siena on 1 July 2009. On 2 September 2013 fourth division club Bellaria – Igea Marina signed Capogrosso. In January 2014 he moved to Torres.

Capogrosso was the reserve member of Italy national under-20 football team in 2009 Mediterranean Games after Luca Marrone withdrew from the reserve list due to injury; both players did not enter the final squad.

On 16 July 2014 he was signed by Lega Pro club Pordenone. On 13 January 2015 Capogrosso and Maurizio Peccarisi moved to Venezia, with Raffaele Franchini and Emanuele Panzeri moved to opposite direction.

In October 2019, Capogrosso joined ASD Siziano Lanterna.

References

External links
 Lega Serie B profile 

Italian footballers
A.C.N. Siena 1904 players
Piacenza Calcio 1919 players
A.S. Gubbio 1910 players
Ascoli Calcio 1898 F.C. players
F.C. Pavia players
A.C. Bellaria Igea Marina players
Pordenone Calcio players
S.E.F. Torres 1903 players
Venezia F.C. players
A.C. Mestre players
Treviso F.B.C. 1993 players
Serie B players
Serie C players
Serie D players
Association football defenders
Sportspeople from the Province of Naples
1989 births
Living people
Footballers from Campania
Milano City F.C. players